is a Japanese light novel series written by Keiichi Sigsawa, with illustrations by Kouhaku Kuroboshi. There are three Allison novels, with the third split into two volumes, published by MediaWorks under their Dengeki Bunko label. The first novel was released on March 10, 2002, and the last novel was published on May 10, 2004. There is a follow-up series of light novels called Lillia and Treize which were released between March 2005 and April 2007. There is also an Allison sound novel for the Nintendo DS which was released on December 7, 2006. A manga adaptation by Hiroki Haruse started serialization in the shōnen manga magazine Dengeki Comic Gao! on July 27, 2007, also published by MediaWorks. The manga ended serialization in Dengeki Comic Gao! on January 27, 2008, but continued serialization in MediaWorks' seinen manga magazine Dengeki Daioh from March 21 to December 27, 2008. It was compiled in two volumes. An anime adaptation based on both the Allison and Lillia and Treize novels, known as Allison & Lillia, aired between April and October 2008.

Plot
Allison is an adventure series set in a world containing one continent (extending roughly from the Equator to 60 degrees North latitude) which is divided down the center by a towering mountain range and a huge river. The industry and technology of the world are roughly equivalent to Europe in the 1930s. Due to the geography, two cultures developed on either side of the divide, and at the time the story begins, the cultures have been at war on and off for hundreds of years. The bloodiest conflict yet began thirty-five years before the start of the story; both sides are so exhausted by the conflict that an uneasy armistice is signed after some five years of fighting. Aside from a brief conflict over the jurisdiction of the river, resulting in the formation of a buffer zone on either side, this peace has largely been unbroken. The entire region comprises sixteen countries which all speak a common language. The region comprises the two kingdoms of Bezel and Iltoa which both serve to bring together a small number of countries under a common language different than that of the eastern region. There are far more blond-haired people in the West than the East.

At the beginning of the first novel, Allison, a pilot in the Roxche Air Force, has come to visit her childhood friend Wilhelm ("Wil" for short), who has remained at school over his summer break to continue his studies. While traveling in the countryside near the school, the two encounter an old man well known to Wil's schoolmates as a teller of tall tales. Nevertheless, he captures their interest with his talk about a "treasure" which, if found, is said to be able to put an end to the war. No one would believe him that the war between the countries could ever end, so no one listened to him. When the old man is abducted and taken over to Sou Beil, Allison and Wil steal an airplane and chase the abductors across the river into the next region. Fortunately, the two were raised as orphans by a woman who came from the West, and thus can speak both languages.

Main characters
Allison Whittington
The series' main protagonist and namesake, Allison is a corporal in the Roxche Air Force. Sent to Future House when her father Oscar Whittington went into battle, the strong-willed, adventurous girl became unlikely friends with the quiet, bookish Wil, making him her "lackey" and getting the two of them into situations with a regularity that would earn them a reputation among the other children. Like Wil, Allison speaks Bezelese fluently, but already knew it when the two met, having learned it from her father. Though she and Wil now spend most of their time apart, they exchange letters frequently and Allison works to arrange meetings between them in often-convoluted ways.

An ace pilot, Allison is fond of unnecessarily acrobatic stunts in missions that amount to delivering planes or engaging in joint emergency training with soldiers from "Across the River". Frequently worried about shrinking military budgets and the limitations of her current position, her ultimate goal is to become a test pilot, where she can have both job security and the opportunity to engage in even more wild maneuvers. She makes money on the side by smuggling and reselling goods from mission sites, and takes holiday more than once by claiming to be in hospital with various injuries, which would have serious consequences were she to be caught. In spite of this, she maintains a good relationship with her fellow soldiers, who actively cover for her during her adventure-related absences.

Though she finds it difficult to admit outright, Allison is in love with Wil and is continually trying to bring the two closer in ways that either Wil fails to notice or other events interrupt. Her current aim is to convince him to attend university in the Roxchean capital where the two can share an apartment, a move Wil resists on financial grounds. However, she refuses to give up, and is encouraged in her efforts by Benedict and (later) Fiona, whose own happy relationship only adds fuel to the fire.

Wilhelm "Wil" Schultz
The male protagonist of the series, Wil is a fifth-year student at the prestigious Rowe Sneum Upper School, where he is one of the top students. Abandoned by his parents at a young age, he grew up under the watchful eye of "granny" Corason Moot at Future House, where he learned Bezelese and gained an interest in the West. Upon Allison's arrival ten years ago, he became her semi-willing "lackey" almost immediately. Now seventeen, he splits his school holidays between on-campus study and his friend's family's palatial estate. Though he is exceptionally bright, Wil's financial situation is tenuous at best and his scholarship dictates that he cannot skip grades or graduate early. When Allison insists on one of their adventures, he relies on her, or his friend's, financial backing.

Having spent much of his childhood with Allison, Wil knows her better than almost anyone, and despite getting roped into her schemes, finds himself able to deal with her impulsiveness and her idiosyncrasies better than most. Nevertheless, when he sees a familiar twinkle in her blue eyes, he knows that something is bound to happen, and it will probably involve him too.

Although Wil is not as physically strong or willing to be involved in the action as his companions, he has dead accurate aim with almost any kind of firearm, a photographic memory, and a strong sense of duty to protect the people and things he cares about, even if it means putting himself in harm's way.

Carr Benedict
(Note: as a resident of Sou Beil, "Carr" is his surname and "Benedict" his personal name.)
The third member of the core cast to appear, Benedict starts out in the series as a 24-year-old sublieutenant in the Sou Beil Air Force. Though an accomplished pilot, he is relegated to a mid-ranking soldier at a base of little note on the edge of the uninhabited Buffer Zone. With few duties of substance, he spends his time flirting with (and trying to pick up) the women of the base, which earns him the ire of his fellow male soldiers. He would even be relatively successful at it, if not for his potential dates discovering that he's asked out everyone else as well. In spite of this, he appears not to be a womanizer so much as genuinely interested in the women in his life, and unable to keep himself from acting on this impulse (albeit to a foolish degree). As a soldier, he is fiercely loyal to his comrades, but harbors a sense of justice that supersedes his official duties, leading him to disobey orders in favor of doing what he feels is right.

Benedict first encounters Allison during a joint training session between Roxche and Sou Beil and is quite taken with her, inviting her to dine with the Sou Beil soldiers in broken Roxchean and later asking her to exchange letters as a couple. Though Allison rebuffs him, he still recognizes her when she and Wil are involved in the incident with Captain Graz's "Gang of Thugs", and pursues them himself with the intent of stopping them non-lethally. Defeated in a one-on-one dogfight, Benedict becomes their ally and defends them against his own, while agreeing to take the credit for their discovery. It is at this point that his life turns upside-down. Lauded as a hero for single-handedly ending the War, Benedict finds himself promoted to the youngest-ever Major in Sou Beil history, recognized wherever he goes, and the recipient of admiration and scorn from fawning women and jealous fellow soldiers, respectively. He views Allison and Wil as the true heroes of the ordeal, and considers all the attention an inconvenience, which he feels he does not deserve anyway. However, his second adventure with them leads to his meeting Fiona, who not only had never heard of him, but forces him into doing something actually heroic. The relationship he forges with her in the process proves to be a lasting one.

Although he does not start out with much knowledge of Roxchean, Benedict studies hard and makes leaps in his command of the language over the course of the series. Nevertheless, he is prone to the occasional slip-up, and prefers to talk to Allison and Wil in Bezelese unless stealth warrants otherwise. At the very least, what he does know is enough for him to woo Fiona, who understands only Ikstovan and Roxchean.

Media

Light novels
Allison began as a series of light novels written by Keiichi Sigsawa and drawn by Kouhaku Kuroboshi. The novels are published by MediaWorks under their Dengeki Bunko publishing label. There are three Allison novels, with the third split into two volumes. The first novel was released on March 10, 2002, and the final novel was published on May 10, 2004. The light novels have sold over one million copies. These novels were developed into the first thirteen episodes of the television adaptation Allison & Lillia.

Visual novel
A sound novel, with card game attributes, based on the series was released on December 7, 2006 in limited and regular editions by MediaWorks playable on the Nintendo DS. Allison is one of the few light novels originally published by MediaWorks that has been made into a sound novel under DS Dengeki Bunko, a section of MediaWorks which produces sound novels playable on the Nintendo DS based from light novels published under MediaWorks' Dengeki Bunko publishing label. Allison was the first game produced under DS Dengeki Bunko, and the only others include Baccano!, Inukami!, and Iriya no Sora, UFO no Natsu.

Manga
A manga adaptation started serialization in the Japanese shōnen manga magazine Dengeki Comic Gao! on July 27, 2007, published by MediaWorks. and ended on December 27, 2008. The manga takes its story from the light novels that preceded it, and is illustrated by Hiroki Haruse. The manga ended serialization in Dengeki Comic Gao! on January 27, 2008, but continued serialization in MediaWorks' shōnen manga magazine Dengeki Daioh on March 21, 2008. The first bound volume was published by ASCII Media Works on April 26, 2008 under their Dengeki Comics label. Two volumes in total were published.

References

External links
Allison at ASCII Media Works 
Visual novel official website 

2002 Japanese novels
2006 video games
Anime and manga based on light novels
Adventure anime and manga
Dengeki Bunko
Dengeki Comic Gao!
Dengeki Comics
Dengeki Daioh
Japan-exclusive video games
Light novels
2007 manga
MediaWorks games
Tale of a Single Continent
Kadokawa Dwango franchises
Nintendo DS games
Nintendo DS-only games
Shōnen manga
Visual novels
Video games developed in Japan
Novels set in the 1930s